The Rumana Subdistrict is a sub-district of Al-Qa'im District on the north side of the Euphrates in west Al Anbar Governorate, on the Iraq-Syria border. Its capital is the town of Rumana. The name means 'pomegranate' in Arabic. Rumana is run by an elected sub-district council and sub-mayor.

It has a population of 8,900 inhabitants. All of them are  Sunni Muslim Arabs, with the main tribes being Al-Bu Mahhal and Al-Marasimah, in addition to some minor tribes. People earn a living by work in farming, fishing, small business, and employment. There is a concrete bridge linking Rumana with Qaim and Al Ubaidi across the Euphrates.

Rumana sub-district fell under ISIL control on 16 June 2014.

Rumana sub-district was recaptured by the Iraqi Army on 13 November 2017.

References

Subdistricts of Iraq
Populated places in Al Anbar Governorate
Populated places along the Silk Road
Populated places on the Euphrates River